Trimethylsilyl cyclopentadiene is an organosilicon compound with the chemical formula C5H5Si(CH3)3.  It exists as a colorless liquid. It is used in the synthesis of some metal cyclopentadienyl complexes and has attracted interest for its fluxional structure.

Trimethylsilyl cyclopentadiene is an example of a molecule that undergoes rapid sigmatropic rearrangement.  Observations of trimethylsilyl cyclopentadiene using gas phase NMR spectroscopy show that the protons on the ring are chemically equivalent, indicated by a single peak.  This phenomenon, an example of fluxionality, is explained by the migration of the silyl group from carbon-to-carbon, thereby giving the appearance of equivalent CH signals.

Properties:

refractive index  n20/D 1.471(lit.)

bp                      138-140 °C(lit.)

density               0.833 g/mL at 25 °C(lit.)

storage temp.   −20 °C

Synthesis 
Trimethylsilyl cyclopentadiene is prepared by the reaction trimethylsilyl chloride (Me3SiCl) with sodium cyclopentadienide (NaC5H5):  
(CH3)3SiCl + NaC5H5 → C5H5Si(CH3)3 + NaCl

References

Cyclopentadienes
Organosilicon compounds
Trimethylsilyl compounds